Berdagulovo (Birźeğol) is a rural locality (a village) in Inzersky Selsoviet, Beloretsky District, Bashkortostan, Russia. The population was 240 as of 2010. There are 7 streets.

Geography 
Berdagulovo is located 70 km northwest of Beloretsk (the district's administrative centre) by road. Revet is the nearest rural locality.

References 

Rural localities in Beloretsky District